Huanggang West railway station is a railway station in Huangzhou District, Huanggang, Hubei, China.

The station was closed from 11 May 2021 to allow for renovations. The work included increasing the number of platforms from two to four and extending the platforms to allow for longer trains.

References 

Railway stations in Hubei
Railway stations in China opened in 2014